SV Henstedt-Ulzburg is a German association football club based in Henstedt-Ulzburg, Schleswig-Holstein. The footballers are part of a 1,500 member sports club that also has departments for athletics, handball, table tennis, and tennis, as well as therapeutic sport.

History 

The football side was formed in 1963 as Sportverein Henstedt-Rhen and recently (2014) advanced to the Schleswig-Holstein-Liga. The club plays its home matches in the Sportanlage am Schäferkampsweg, which has a capacity of 2,000.

After playing in the tier five Schleswig-Holstein-Liga from 2008 to 2013 and, again, from 2014 to 2016, the club was relegated to the Verbandsliga at the end of the 2015–16 season.

Honours 
The club's honours:
 Verbandsliga Schleswig-Holstein: 2006

External links 
 

Football clubs in Germany
Football clubs in Schleswig-Holstein
Association football clubs established in 1963
1963 establishments in West Germany